The impact of artificial intelligence on workers includes both applications to improve worker safety and health, and potential hazards that must be controlled.

One potential application is using AI to eliminate hazards by removing humans from hazardous situations that involve risk of stress, overwork, or musculoskeletal injuries.  Predictive analytics may also be used to identify conditions that may lead to hazards such as fatigue, repetitive strain injuries, or toxic substance exposure, leading to earlier interventions.  Another is to streamline workplace safety and health workflows through automating repetitive tasks, enhancing safety training programs through virtual reality, or detecting and reporting near misses.

When used in the workplace, AI also presents the possibility of new hazards.  These may arise from machine learning techniques leading to unpredictable behavior and inscrutability in their decision-making, or from cybersecurity and information privacy issues.  Many hazards of AI are psychosocial due to its potential to cause changes in work organization.  These include changes in the skills required of workers, increased monitoring leading to micromanagement, algorithms unintentionally or intentionally mimicking undesirable human biases, and assigning blame for machine errors to the human operator instead.  AI may also lead to physical hazards in the form of human–robot collisions, and ergonomic risks of control interfaces and human–machine interactions.  Hazard controls include cybersecurity and information privacy measures, communication and transparency with workers about data usage, and limitations on collaborative robots.

From a workplace safety and health perspective, only "weak" or "narrow" AI that is tailored to a specific task is relevant, as there are many examples that are currently in use or expected to come into use in the near future.  "Strong" or "general" AI is not expected to be feasible in the near future, and discussion of its risks is within the purview of futurists and philosophers rather than industrial hygienists.

Certain digital technologies are predicted to result in job losses. In recent years, the adoption of modern robotics has led to net employment growth. However, many businesses anticipate that automation, or employing robots would result in job losses in the future. This is especially true for companies in Central and Eastern Europe. Other digital technologies, such as platforms or big data, are projected to have a more neutral impact on employment.

Health and safety applications 
In order for any potential AI health and safety application to be adopted, it requires acceptance by both managers and workers.  For example, worker acceptance may be diminished by concerns about information privacy, or from a lack of trust and acceptance of the new technology, which may arise from inadequate transparency or training.  Alternatively, managers may emphasize increases in economic productivity rather than gains in worker safety and health when implementing AI-based systems.

Eliminating hazardous tasks 

AI may increase the scope of work tasks where a worker can be removed from a situation that carries risk.  In a sense, while traditional automation can replace the functions of a worker's body with a robot, AI effectively replaces the functions of their brain with a computer.  Hazards that can be avoided include stress, overwork, musculoskeletal injuries, and boredom.  

This can expand the range of affected job sectors into white-collar and service sector jobs such as in medicine, finance, and information technology.  As an example, call center workers face extensive health and safety risks due to its repetitive and demanding nature and its high rates of micro-surveillance. AI-enabled chatbots lower the need for humans to perform the most basic call center tasks.

Analytics to reduce risk 

Machine learning is used for people analytics to make predictions about worker behavior to assist management decision-making, such as hiring and performance assessment.  These could also be used to improve worker health.  The analytics may be based on inputs such as online activities, monitoring of communications, location tracking, and voice analysis and body language analysis of filmed interviews.  For example, sentiment analysis may be used to spot fatigue to prevent overwork.  Decision support systems have a similar ability to be used to, for example, prevent industrial disasters or make disaster response more efficient.

For manual material handling workers, predictive analytics and artificial intelligence may be used to reduce musculoskeletal injury.  Traditional guidelines are based on statistical averages and are geared towards anthropometrically typical humans.  The analysis of large amounts of data from wearable sensors may allow real-time, personalized calculation of ergonomic risk and fatigue management, as well as better analysis of the risk associated with specific job roles.

Wearable sensors may also enable earlier intervention against exposure to toxic substances than is possible with area or breathing zone testing on a periodic basis. Furthermore, the large data sets generated could improve workplace health surveillance, risk assessment, and research.

Streamlining safety and health workflows 
AI can also be used to make the workplace safety and health workflow more efficient.  One example is coding of workers' compensation claims, which are submitted in a prose narrative form and must manually be assigned standardized codes.  AI is being investigated to perform this task faster, more cheaply, and with fewer errors.

AI‐enabled virtual reality systems may be useful for safety training for hazard recognition.

Artificial intelligence may be used to more efficiently detect near misses.  Reporting and analysis of near misses are important in reducing accident rates, but they are often underreported because they are not noticed by humans, or are not reported by workers due to social factors.

Hazards 

There are several broad aspects of AI that may give rise to specific hazards.  The risks depend on implementation rather than the mere presence of AI.  

Systems using sub-symbolic AI such as machine learning may behave unpredictably and are more prone to inscrutability in their decision-making.  This is especially true if a situation is encountered that was not part of the AI's training dataset, and is exacerbated in environments that are less structured.  Undesired behavior may also arise from flaws in the system's perception (arising either from within the software or from sensor degradation), knowledge representation and reasoning, or from software bugs.  They may arise from improper training, such as a user applying the same algorithm to two problems that do not have the same requirements.  Machine learning applied during the design phase may have different implications than that applied at runtime.  Systems using symbolic AI are less prone to unpredictable behavior.

The use of AI also increases cybersecurity risks relative to platforms that do not use AI, and information privacy concerns about collected data may pose a hazard to workers.

Psychosocial 

Psychosocial hazards are those that arise from the way work is designed, organized, and managed, or its economic and social contexts, rather than arising from a physical substance or object.  They cause not only psychiatric and psychological outcomes such as occupational burnout, anxiety disorders, and depression, but they can also cause physical injury or illness such as cardiovascular disease or musculoskeletal injury.  Many hazards of AI are psychosocial in nature due to its potential to cause changes in work organization, in terms of increasing complexity and interaction between different organizational factors.  However, psychosocial risks are often overlooked by designers of advanced manufacturing systems.

Changes in work practices 
AI is expected to lead to changes in the skills required of workers, requiring training of existing workers, flexibility, and openness to change.  The requirement for combining conventional expertise with computer skills may be challenging for existing workers.  Over-reliance on AI tools may lead to deskilling of some professions.

Increased monitoring may lead to micromanagement and thus to stress and anxiety.  A perception of surveillance may also lead to stress.  Controls for these include consultation with worker groups, extensive testing, and attention to introduced bias.  Wearable sensors, activity trackers, and augmented reality may also lead to stress from micromanagement, both for assembly line workers and gig workers.  Gig workers also lack the legal protections and rights of formal workers.

There is also the risk of people being forced to work at a robot's pace, or to monitor robot performance at nonstandard hours.

Bias 

Algorithms trained on past decisions may mimic undesirable human biases, for example, past discriminatory hiring and firing practices.  Information asymmetry between management and workers may lead to stress, if workers do not have access to the data or algorithms that are the basis for decision-making.

In addition to building a model with inadvertently discriminatory features, intentional discrimination may occur through designing metrics that covertly result in discrimination through correlated variables in a non-obvious way.

In complex human‐machine interactions, some approaches to accident analysis may be biased to safeguard a technological system and its developers by assigning blame to the individual human operator instead.

Physical 

Physical hazards in the form of human–robot collisions may arise from robots using AI, especially collaborative robots (cobots).  Cobots are intended to operate in close proximity to humans, which makes impossible the common hazard control of isolating the robot using fences or other barriers, which is widely used for traditional industrial robots.  Automated guided vehicles are a type of cobot that as of 2019 are in common use, often as forklifts or pallet jacks in warehouses or factories.  For cobots, sensor malfunctions or unexpected work environment conditions can lead to unpredictable robot behavior and thus to human–robot collisions.

Self-driving cars are another example of AI-enabled robots.  In addition, the ergonomics of control interfaces and human–machine interactions may give rise to hazards.

Hazard controls 
AI, in common with other computational technologies, requires cybersecurity measures to stop software breaches and intrusions, as well as information privacy measures.  Communication and transparency with workers about data usage is a control for psychosocial hazards arising from security and privacy issues. Proposed best practices for employer‐sponsored worker monitoring programs include using only validated sensor technologies; ensuring voluntary worker participation; ceasing data collection outside the workplace; disclosing all data uses; and ensuring secure data storage.

For industrial cobots equipped with AI‐enabled sensors, the International Organization for Standardization (ISO) recommended: (a) safety‐related monitored stopping controls; (b) human hand guiding of the cobot; (c) speed and separation monitoring controls; and (d) power and force limitations.  Networked AI-enabled cobots may share safety improvements with each other. Human oversight is another general hazard control for AI.

Risk management 
Both applications and hazards arising from AI can be considered as part of existing frameworks for occupational health and safety risk management.  As with all hazards, risk identification is most effective and least costly when done in the design phase.

Workplace health surveillance, the collection and analysis of health data on workers, is challenging for AI because labor data are often reported in aggregate and does not provide breakdowns between different types of work, and is focused on economic data such as wages and employment rates rather than skill content of jobs.  Proxies for skill content include educational requirements and classifications of routine versus non-routine, and cognitive versus physical jobs.  However, these may still not be specific enough to distinguish specific occupations that have distinct impacts from AI.  The United States Department of Labor's Occupational Information Network is an example of a database with a detailed taxonomy of skills.  Additionally, data are often reported on a national level, while there is much geographical variation, especially between urban and rural areas.

Standards and regulation 

, ISO was developing a standard on the use of metrics and dashboards, information displays presenting company metrics for managers, in workplaces.  The standard is planned to include guidelines for both gathering data and displaying it in a viewable and useful manner.

In the European Union, the General Data Protection Regulation, while oriented towards consumer data, is also relevant for workplace data collection.  Data subjects, including workers, have "the right not to be subject to a decision based solely on automated processing".  Other relevant EU directives include the Machinery Directive (2006/42/EC), the Radio Equipment Directive (2014/53/EU), and the General Product Safety Directive (2001/95/EC).

References 

Artificial intelligence
Occupational safety and health